The 2009 Trinidad and Tobago League Cup was the tenth season of the First Citizens Cup, which is the league cup competition for Trinidad and Tobago teams competing in the TT Pro League. Continuing from previous seasons, the slogan for the year's league cup was No Room for Losers and was sponsored by First Citizens Bank for the ninth consecutive year. To keep with the tag-line, this year's edition will only reward prizes to the cup winners and runner-up. The Savonetta Boys of W Connection entered as the five-time defending cup holders by winning the 2008 league cup over Joe Public 6–5 in a penalty shootout after the match ended 2–2 in regulation.

Qualification

Seeding for the competition was determined from the league standings following the twentieth league match day. The bottom two teams, Tobago United and Police, were placed in the 10th place playoff to determine who would advance to face Defence Force in one of two qualifying round matches, with the other game matching St. Ann's Rangers up with FC South End.

The two teams that win their respective quarterfinal matches will meet up with the top six teams in the Pro League. The automatic quarterfinal qualifiers in order of league position are: Joe Public, Caledonia AIA, Ma Pau, San Juan Jabloteh, United Petrotrin, and W Connection.

Schedule
The schedule for the 2009 First Citizens Cup, as announced by the TT Pro League:

Bracket

Results
All matches were played for 90 minutes duration, at the end of which if the match was still tied, penalty-kicks were used to determine the match winner.

10th place playoff
The knockout cup began with the 10th place playoff between the bottom two clubs in the 2009 season following Match Day 20, Tobago United and Police, on 1 September at Plymouth Recreation Grounds. The Tobago Boys came out on top by a score of 3–1 following goals from Collie Hercules, Benjamin Bottino, and Dwayne Jack.

Qualifying round
St. Ann's Rangers used three saves from Haitian Fortunato Valcourt from penalty kicks to defeat FC South End and advanced to face top-seed Joe Public. In the earlier match, Defence Force scored two first half goals on its way past Tobago United by a 2–1 score into the quarterfinals to face Caledonia AIA.

Quarterfinals
The biggest surprise of the tournament came in the quarterfinals, when Ma Pau upset the defending champions W Connection at Manny Ramjohn Stadium by a 3–1 score. Joining the Casino Boys were Joe Public, San Juan Jabloteh, and Defence Force into the semifinals.

Semifinals
On 25 September, Joe Public used goals from Trent Noel and Seon Power to defeat San Juan Jabloteh and book their place in the final. In the other semifinal, Defence Force shutout Ma Pau 2–0 with goals from Richard Roy and Devorn Jorsling.

Final
The tournament was concluded on 2 October when Defence Force upset Joe Public 1–0 in Marvin Lee Stadium to claim their second First Citizens Cup title and end their six-year trophy drought. On the other hand, Joe Public suffered their second consecutive defeat in the league cup final having lost to W Connection on penalty kicks in last year's edition. Teammates Devorn Jorsling and Richard Roy finished as the tournament's top goal scorers with 3 goals each.

References

External links
Official Website

2009 First Citizens Cup
Trinidad and Tobago FCB Cup
Lea